Ganglioneuroma is a rare and benign tumor of the autonomic nerve fibers arising from neural crest sympathogonia, which are completely undifferentiated cells of the sympathetic nervous system. However, ganglioneuromas themselves are fully differentiated neuronal tumors that do not contain immature elements.

Ganglioneuromas most frequently occur in the abdomen, however these tumors can grow anywhere sympathetic nervous tissue is found. Other common locations include the adrenal gland, paraspinal retroperitoneum, posterior mediastinum, head, and neck. It is contained within the neuroblastic tumors group, which includes: Ganglioneuroma (benign), Ganglioneuroblastoma (intermediate), Neuroblastoma (aggressive).

Symptoms and signs 
A ganglioneuroma is typically asymptomatic, and is typically only discovered when being examined or treated for another condition. Any symptoms will depend upon the tumor's location and the nearby organs affected.

For example, a tumor in the chest area may cause breathing difficulty, chest pain, and trachea compression. If the tumor is located lower in the abdomen, it may cause abdominal pain and bloating. A tumor near the spinal cord may cause spinal deformity or spinal compression, leading to pain and loss of muscle control or sensation in the legs and/or arms.

These tumors may produce certain hormones, which can cause diarrhea, an enlarged clitoris (in females), high blood pressure, increased body hair, and sweating.

Cause 
There are no known risk factors for ganglioneuromas. However, the tumors may be associated with some genetic problems, such as neurofibromatosis type 1.

Pathology

Pathologically, ganglioneuromas are composed of ganglion cells, Schwann cells and fibrous tissue. Ganglioneuromas are solid, firm tumours that typically are white when seen with the naked eye.

Diagnosis 
Ganglioneuromas can be diagnosed visually by a CT scan,  MRI scan, or an ultrasound of the head, abdomen, or pelvis. Blood and urine tests may be done to determine if the tumor is secreting hormones or other circulating chemicals. A biopsy of the tumor may be required to confirm the diagnosis.

Treatment 
Because ganglioneuromas are benign, treatment may not be necessary, as it would expose patients to more risk than leaving it alone. 

If there are symptoms or major physical deformity, treatment usually consists of surgery to remove the tumor.

Prognosis 
Most ganglioneuromas are noncancerous, thus expected outcome is usually good. However, a ganglioneuroma may become cancerous and spread to other areas, or it may regrow after removal.

If the tumor has been present for a long time and has pressed on the spinal cord or caused other symptoms, it may have caused irreversible damage that cannot be corrected with the surgical removal of the tumor. Compression of the spinal cord may result in paralysis, especially if the cause is not detected promptly.

References

External links 

Nervous system neoplasia
Dermal and subcutaneous growths